Pete Barnacle is an English rock drummer who has played for various bands including Gillan, Girl, Broken Home, Spear of Destiny, Theatre of Hate, Yngwie Malmsteen (on the 1990 Eclipse World Tour), Sheer Greed, and Soldiers of Fortune. Barnacle now lives in Japan, teaching English, and occasionally working as a drummer.

Career 
Pete Barnacle was a member of Gillan in 1979 touring in Japan, then was part of Broken Home. He joined Girl in 1981, playing alongside Phil Collen. He played on Strange Cruise's self-titled debut album in 1986 before joining Spear Of Destiny in 1987, playing on three albums: Outland (1987), Price You Pay (1988) and SOD's Law in 1992. This band also toured in 1991 billed as Theatre Of Hate.

Since 2006, formed the band GoDoG together Sakate Sōtarō and Hashimoto Hiroyuk.

With Gillan 
The line-up of Gillan in which he played was:
Ian Gillan - lead vocals
Steve Byrd - guitar
John McCoy - bass
Colin Towns - keyboards
Pete Barnacle - drums
Ian Gillan also sang for the bands Deep Purple, Ian Gillan Band and Black Sabbath.

Barnacle is named as a musician on Gillan's self-titled album although he never actually played on the album, but performed live with the band.

With Girl
The line-up of Girl in which he played was:
Phil Lewis - lead vocals
Phil Collen - guitar
Gerry Laffy - guitar
Simon Laffy - bass
Pete Barnacle- drums
Pete Barnacle played on the Girl albums Killing Time and Live at the Marquee.

With Broken Home
Broken Home were:
Jeff Dicken - guitar, vocals
Rory Wilson - guitar, vocals
Pete Crowther - bass, guitar, keyboards
Pete Barnacle - drums, percussion, vocals

Broken Home released a self-titled album, which was produced by Robert John "Mutt" Lange.

With Spear of Destiny
Spear of Destiny were:

(1987)
Kirk Brandon - vocals, guitar
Volker Janssen - keyboards
Mick Procter - guitar
Steve Barnacle - bass
Pete Barnacle - drums

(1988)
Kirk Brandon - vocals, guitar
Chris Bostock - bass
Volker Janssen - keyboards
Pete Barnacle - drums

With Theatre of Hate
(1991)
Kirk Brandon - vocals, guitar
Stan Stammers - bass guitar
John 'Boy' Lennard - saxophone
Mark 'Gemini' Thwaite - lead and rhythm guitar, bass guitar
Pete Barnacle - drums

Pete was a member of Spear of Destiny from 1987–1989, recording two albums (Outlands and The Price You Pay) touring extensively in the UK and mainland Europe, and making numerous TV appearances. He returned with Theatre of Hate in 1991 for the Return to 8 Tour, and again in 1992 with Spear of Destiny after his stint with Yngwie Malmsteen, for a tour and the Sod's Law album.

With Sheer Greed
Sheer Greed were:
Gerry Laffy- lead vocals and guitar
Neil Gabbitas- guitar
Simon Laffy- bass
Pete Barnacle- drums

Phil Lewis and Phil Collen also made guest appearances with Sheer Greed.

With Yngwie Malmsteen
The line-up on Yngwie Malmsteen's Eclipse Tour was:
Yngwie Malmsteen - guitar, vocals
Goran Edman - lead vocals
Svante Henryson - bass
Mats Olausson - keyboards
Pete Barnacle - drums

With Soldiers of Fortune
Soldiers of Fortune are:
Masanobu Yasui - guitar
Yasunori Kusanobu - bass
Pete Barnacle - drums, vocals
Masaki Fujii - lead vocals

This band was formed in Okayama, Japan, in 2002. They have released one CD, Fighting to Survive, on Storm Force Records, and played numerous live shows up and down Japan.

References

External links
Soldiers of Fortune official website

English rock drummers
British male drummers
Girl (band) members
Sheer Greed members
Living people
Year of birth missing (living people)
Place of birth missing (living people)
Theatre of Hate members
Spear of Destiny (band) members
Gillan (band) members
Yngwie J. Malmsteen's Rising Force members